The Family Life Network is a Christian radio network simulcasting via FM stations  across Western and Central New York, as well as northern Pennsylvania from flagship station WCIK. It is owned and operated by the larger Family Life Ministries of Bath, New York.  Founded in 1957, FLM is an accredited member of the Evangelical Council for Financial Accountability (ECFA). Family Life is a listener-supported outreach with about 95% of its operating revenue coming directly from listeners, participants, and supporting churches.

The Family Life Network should not be confused with the unrelated Family Life Communications (also known as Family Life Radio), a chain of similar radio stations in Michigan and the southwest.

History 

For most of its first 30 years of existence, Family Life Ministries operated a single FM radio station, Bath's WCIK. With the release of Docket 80-90 and the massive expansion of rural and suburban FM radio signals in the late 1980s, Family Life rapidly expanded into a network, beginning with WCID in Friendship, New York (now WCOV).

Family Life maintains an active presence in buying and selling stations and translators in its coverage area, a practice that takes advantage of the ministry's status as a religious broadcaster and its exemption from caps on the number of stations it can own in one broadcast area. It has largely avoided AM radio; when presented with a right of first refusal to buy an AM station in Syracuse, it declined, and it quickly spun off two others in Elmira and Salamanca two months after acquiring them in the wake of Waypoint Media's dissolution.

All of Family Life's stations begin with call signs WCI, WCO, WCG or WCD. According to the company's station list, these abbreviations stand for Where Christ Is, Where Christ Offers, Where Christ Grants and With Christ Discover. Flagship WCIK, for example, represents "Where Christ Is King."

Stations and Translators by Markets

New York

Binghamton 

 WCII - Spencer - 88.5 FM with 17,000 watts.
 WCIJ - Unadilla - 88.9 FM with 5,000 watts.
Translators

Buffalo 

 WCOF - Arcade - 89.5 FM with 1,000 watts.
 WCOM-FM - Silver Creek - 89.3 FM with 8,000 watts.
 WCOU - Attica - 88.3 FM with 11,000 watts.
 WBUF-HD2 - Buffalo - 92.9 FM (owned by Townsquare Media, HD2 channel operated by FLN under a local marketing agreement) with 76,000 watts.
Translators

Elmira 

 WCDN-FM - Ridgebury, Pennsylvania - 90.3 FM with 4,000 watts.
 WCIG - Big Flats - 97.7 FM with 610 watts.
 WCIH - Elmira - 94.3 FM with 1,200 watts.
 WCIK - Avoca - 103.1 FM with 1,400 watts. (flagship station)
 WCIN - Bath - 88.3 FM with 250 watts.
Translators

Rochester 

 WCIY - Canandaigua - 88.9 FM with 680 watts.
 WCIP - Clyde - 93.7 FM with 3,800 watts.
 WBZA-HD2 - Rochester - 98.9 FM (owned by Audacy, Inc., HD2 channel operated by FLN under a local marketing agreement)
 WCGI  - Kendall - 90.7 FM (purchase and repurposing of WGCC-FM—Batavia pending FCC approval)
Translators

Syracuse 

 WCIT-FM - Oneida - 106.3 FM with 1,250 watts.
 WCIS-FM - DeRuyter - 105.1 FM with 33,000 watts.
 WCIO - Oswego - 96.7 FM with 3,400 watts
Translators

Western Twin Tiers 

 WCGS - Little Valley, New York - 105.9 FM with 7,000 watts.
 WCOV-FM - Friendship, New York - 89.1 FM with 7,000 watts.
 WCOT - Tidioute, Pennsylvania (formerly Jamestown, New York) - 90.9 FM with 12,000 watts.
 WCOQ – Alfred, New York – 101.9 FM with 1,000 watts.
 WCOP - Eldred, Pennsylvania - 103.9 FM with 1,200 watts.
 WCOR-FM – Bradford, Pennsylvania – 96.7 FM with 420 watts.
Translators

Pennsylvania

Central Pennsylvania
 WCOG-FM - Galeton - 100.7 FM with 7,700 watts.
 WCOH - DuBois - 107.3 FM with 18,500 watts.
  WCOA-FM - Johnstown 88.5 FM with 10,000 watts.
  WCOB - State College 88.3 FM with 1800 watts.
 WCOX - Bedford 91.1 FM with 4,000 watts.
 WILQ-HD2 - Williamsport - 105.1 FM (owned by Van Michael, HD2 operated by FLN under a local marketing agreement) with 638 watts digital.
Translators

Erie 

 WCGV - Cambridge Springs - 89.9 FM with 25,000 watts.
 WCGM - Wattsburg - 102.7 FM with 3,500 watts.
 WCGH - Farmington Township - 106.1 FM with 3,200 watts.
 WCGT - Clintonville - 88.7 FM (formerly 89.1 WGIP—Tidioute, acquired from Dove FM in May 2020; further relocations pending)
Translators

Northeastern Pennsylvania 

 WCDH - Shenandoah - 91.5 FM with 1,200 watts.
 WCDJ - Tunkhannock - 91.3 FM with 250 watts.
 WCDR - Laporte - 90.9 FM with 250 watts.
 WCDV-FM - Trout Run - 90.1 FM with 350 watts.
Translators

References 

Christian radio stations in the United States
American radio networks